Ride Me is a 1994 romantic comedy directed by Bashir Shbib. The film is set in Las Vegas.

References

External links 
 

1994 films
English-language Canadian films
1994 romantic comedy films
Films set in the Las Vegas Valley
American romantic comedy films
Films directed by Bashar Shbib
Canadian romantic comedy films
1990s English-language films
1990s American films
1990s Canadian films